Libya sent its largest ever delegation to the 2000 Summer Paralympics in Sydney, with three judokas, two powerlifters and a sitting volleyball team. The country's only female competitor, Ghazala M. Ali in powerlifting, was the first ever woman to represent Libya at the Paralympic Games.

Team 
Competing in only their second ever Paralympic Games, Libya was represented 17 sportspeople in Sydney, including three judokas, two powerlifters and a sitting volleyball team. The country's only female competitor, Ghazala M. Ali in powerlifting, was the first ever woman to represent Libya at the Paralympic Games.

Medals 

The 2000 Games saw Libya win its first (and so far only) Paralympic medal, when Abdelrahim Hamed took bronze in the men's over 100 kg in powerlifting, lifting 235 kg.

See also
Libya at the Paralympics
Libya at the 2000 Summer Olympics

References

External links
International Paralympic Committee

Nations at the 2000 Summer Paralympics
2000
Paralympics